The Octoroon is a play by Dion Boucicault that opened in 1859 at The Winter Garden Theatre, New York City. Extremely popular, the play was kept running continuously for years by seven road companies. Among antebellum melodramas, it was considered second in popularity only to Uncle Tom's Cabin (1852).

Boucicault adapted the play from the novel The Quadroon by Thomas Mayne Reid (1856). It concerns the residents of a Louisiana plantation called Terrebonne, and sparked debates about the abolition of slavery and the role of theatre in politics. It contains elements of Romanticism and melodrama.

The word octoroon signifies a person of one-eighth African ancestry. In comparison, a quadroon would have one quarter African ancestry and a mulatto for the most part has historically implied half African ancestry.

The Oxford English Dictionary cites The Octoroon with the earliest record of the word "mashup" with the quote: "He don't understand; he speaks a mash up of Indian, French, and Mexican." Boucicault's manuscript actually reads "Indian, French and 'Merican."  The last word, an important colloquialism, was misread by the typesetter of the play.

Plot

Act I

George Peyton returns to the United States from a trip to France to find that the plantation he has inherited is in dire financial straits as a result of his late uncle's beneficence. Jacob McClosky, the man who ruined Judge Peyton, has come to inform George and his aunt (who was bequeathed a life interest in the estate) that their land will be sold and their slaves auctioned off separately. Salem Scudder, a kind Yankee, was Judge Peyton's business partner; though he wishes he could save Terrebonne, he has no money.

George is courted by the rich Southern belle heiress Dora Sunnyside, but he finds himself falling in love with Zoe, the daughter of his uncle through one of the slaves. Dora, oblivious to George's lack of affection for her, enlists Zoe's help to win him over. McClosky desires Zoe for himself, and when she rejects his proposition, he plots to have her sold with the rest of the slaves, for he knows that she is an octoroon and is legally part of the Terrebonne property. He plans to buy her and make her his mistress.

Act II
McClosky intercepts a young slave boy, Paul, who is bringing a mailbag to the house which contains a letter from one of Judge Peyton's old debtors. Since this letter would allow Mrs. Peyton to avoid selling Terrebonne, McClosky kills Paul and takes the letter. The murder is captured on Scudder's photographic apparatus. Paul's best friend, the Indian Wahnotee, discovers Paul's body; he can speak only poor English, however, and is unable to communicate the tragedy to anyone else.

George and Zoe reveal their love for each other, but Zoe rejects George's marriage proposal. When George asks why, Zoe explains that she is an octoroon, and the law prevents a white man from marrying anyone with the smallest black heritage. George offers to take her to a different country, but Zoe insists that she stay to help Terrebonne; Scudder then appears and suggests that George marry Dora. With Dora's wealth, he explains, Terrebonne will not be sold and the slaves will not have to be separated. George reluctantly agrees.

Act III

George goes to Dora and begins to propose to her; while he is doing so, however, he has a change of heart and decides not to lie to her. He and Zoe admit to their love of each other; a heartbroken Dora leaves. The auctioneer arrives, along with prospective buyers, McClosky among them. After various slaves are auctioned off, George and the buyers are shocked to see Zoe up on the stand. McClosky has proved that Judge Peyton did not succeed in legally freeing her, as he had meant to do. Dora then reappears and bids on Zoe – she has sold her own plantation in order to rescue Terrebonne. McClosky, however, outbids her for Zoe; George is restrained from attacking him by his friends.

Act IV

The buyers gather to take away the slaves they have purchased on a steamship. They have realized that Paul is missing, and most believe him dead. Wahnotee appears, drunk and sorrowful, and tells them that Paul is buried near them. The men accuse Wahnotee of the murder, and McClosky calls for him to be lynched. Scudder insists that they hold a trial, and the men search for evidence. Just as McClosky points out the blood on Wahnotee's tomahawk, the oldest slave, Pete, comes to give them the photographic plate which has captured McClosky's deed. The men begin to call for McClosky to be lynched, but Scudder convinces them to send him to jail instead.

Act V

The men leave to fetch the authorities, but McClosky escapes. Stealing a lantern, he sets fire to the steamship that had the slaves on board. Wahnotee tracks him down and confronts him; in the ensuing struggle, Wahnotee kills McClosky. Back at Terrebonne, Zoe returns but with a sad heart, as she knows that she and George can never be together. In an act of desperation she drinks a vial of poison, and Scudder enters to deliver the good news that McClosky was proven guilty of murdering Paul and that Terrebonne now belongs to George. Despite the happiness Zoe stands dying and the play ends with her death on the sitting-room couch and George kneeling beside her.

Alternative endings
When the play was performed in England it was given a happy ending, in which the mixed-race couple are united. The tragic ending was used for American audiences, to avoid portraying a mixed marriage.

Adaptations
The play was adapted by Branden Jacobs-Jenkins as An Octoroon in 2014.

References

External links
 A four-act version of the play

Plays by Dion Boucicault
1859 plays
Plays about race and ethnicity
Plays set in Louisiana
Plays about slavery
Works about American slavery
Plays based on novels
Irish plays adapted into films